William Lane (fl. 15th century) was a Canon of Windsor from 1403 to 1404

Career

He was appointed:
Chaplain of the King’s Free Chapel in Southampton Castle 1392
Archpriest of the Oratory of Holy Trinity, Barton, Isle of Wight 1392
Master of St Mark’s Hospital, Billeswyk, Bristol 1393
Prebendary of St Stephen’s Westminster, 1395 - 1402
Prebendary of Carlton Kyme in Lincoln 1402

He was appointed to the first stall in St George's Chapel, Windsor Castle in 1403 and held the canonry until 1404.

Notes 

Canons of Windsor